Meehania cordata, also known as Meehan's mint or creeping mint, is a perennial plant of the genus Meehania, within the family Lamiaceae found in moist shady banks west of Pennsylvania to Illinois, Tennessee, and North Carolina around the month of June.

Description
Meehania, which was named by Nathaniel Lord Britton for the late Thomas Meehan, Philadelphian botanist, is a dicot perennial plant with calyx rather obliquely 5-toothed, 15 nerved. Corolla ample, expanded at the throat; the upper lip flattish or concave, 2-lobed, the lower 3-cleft, the middle lobe largest. Stamens 4, ascending, the lower pair shorter; anther-cells parallel. Low stoloniferous herb, with a pale purplish flowers.

Meehania cordata, which is one of seven species of the genus Meehania and  named by the English botanist Thomas Nuttall, are low, with  slender runners, hairy; leaves broadly heart-shaped, crenate, petioled, the floral shorter than the calyx; whorls few-flowered, at the summit of short ascending stems; corolla hairy inside, 2–3.5 cm. long; stamens shorter than the upper lip. .

Distribution
It is found mostly in eastern North America. In the states of 
 Illinois
 Kentucky
 North Carolina
 Ohio
 Pennsylvania
 Tennessee
 Virginia
 West Virginia

Threatened and endangered information
This plant is listed by the U.S. federal government or a state.
 Pennsylvania: heart-leafed meehania:	            	Endangered   
 Tennessee: heartleaf meehania:	            	Threatened

References

Lamiaceae
Flora of the Eastern United States
Plants described in 1818